This is the list of professional football clubs and sport clubs with a football team in Bangladesh. There is a total of 40 clubs in Bangladesh playing football.

Bangladesh Premier League

The Bangladesh Premier League is the top tier of Bangladeshi professional football league pyramid, since 2007. It is run directly by the professional football league committee of Bangladesh Football Federation (BFF).

Abahani Limited Dhaka 
AFC Uttara
Bangladesh Police FC
Chittagong Abahani Limited 
Bashundhara Kings 
Fortis FC
Dhaka Mohammedan 
Muktijoddha Sangsad KS
Sheikh Russel KC 
Sheikh Jamal Dhanmondi Club 
Rahmatganj MFS

Bangladesh Championship League

Bangladesh Championship League is the second-tier football league of Bangladesh run by the Bangladesh Football Federation. It was founded in 2012.
Agrani Bank Ltd. SC
Uttara FC
Gopalganj Sporting Club
Farashganj SC
Dhaka WC
NoFeL Sporting Club
BFF Elite Football Academy (Academy team and they will not be subject to promotion or relegation regardless of their position in the points table of the league)
Fakierpool YMC
Kawran Bazar PS
Wari Club
 Fortis FC
Swadhinata KS
Brothers Union (will not participate in the upcoming 2021–22 Bangladesh Championship League season)

Dhaka League

Dhaka League, currently known as Dhaka Senior Division League, is the third tier of football league in Bangladesh played by clubs in Dhaka. It is the country's most historic league and existed even before the nations independence. The league had its first season in 1948.
Dhaka United SC
PWD SC
Jatrabari Krira Chakra
Mohakhali XI
Badda Jagoroni Sangsad
Bangladesh Boys Club
 T&T Club Motijheel
Koshaituli Samaj Kollyan Sangsad
Nawabpur Krira Sangha
Basabo Tarun Sangha
Sadharan Bima Sangstha
Friends Social Organisation
Dhaka City FC
Victoria SC

Dhaka Second Division Football League

Dhaka Second Division Football League is the fourth-tier football league in Bangladesh. The league was founded in 1948 while Bangladesh were under the Pakistani control.
Kingstar Sporting Club
Asaduzzaman FA
Jahid Ahsan Sohel KC
Shantinagar Club
Alamgir Shomaj Kollayan KS
Kallol  Shangha
The Muslim Institute
Dipali Jubo Shangha
Narinda JLC
Bikrampur Kings

Dhaka Third Division Football League

Dhaka Third Division Football League is the fifth tier football league in Bangladesh which was established in 2003 by the Bangladesh Football Federation.
Tangail FA
Uttara Friends Club
Lalbagh SC
Wajed Miya KC
Rainbow Athletic Club
Araf Sporting Club

Pioneer Football League
Pioneer Football League is the fifth tier football league in Bangladesh. The Pioneer Football League is the only age-level league played under the Bangladesh Football Federation. Each year, 64 under-16 boys teams from across country take part in the preliminary round of the league. The teams are divided into 8 groups of 8 to play in eight zones in the preliminary round.
Chawkbazar United
Fakirerpool Shurjo Torun Shangha
Skylark Football Club
tarik rahman sporting club
 Note. This is not the complete list of the clubs participating in the Pioneer Football League in recent seasons .

References

Bangladesh
Football clubs
 
Football clubs